Seán Moncrieff is an Irish broadcaster, journalist and writer. He currently presents the weekday afternoon radio show  Moncrieff on Newstalk and is a columnist for The Irish Times. His television credits include his own Raidió Teilifís Éireann (RTÉ) chat show Good Grief Moncrieff!, comedy panel show Don't Feed the Gondolas, and The Restaurant of which he is the voice. Moncrieff has also written novels and non-fiction.

Early life
Seán Moncrieff was born in London to a mother from County Mayo, Ireland, and a father from Edinburgh, Scotland. When he was twelve, his family moved to Ballinasloe, County Galway, where he attended Garbally College. After school he studied journalism in Dublin and, later on, did a degree in English and Philosophy in University College Dublin (UCD).

Broadcasting and journalism
Moncrieff initially worked as a freelance journalist in Dublin, writing on everything from flower shows to the conflict in the Middle East. He then moved to London, where he worked for the television trade magazine Broadcast, and then as a researcher for Channel 4.

Upon returning to Ireland, he resumed his career as a freelance journalist, but also began working for Raidió Teilifís Éireann (RTÉ). He started on radio with the daily It Says In the Papers, and followed this up on television by presenting The End, Good Grief Moncrieff!, Black Box and Don't Feed the Gondolas. On RTÉ Radio he presented the Saturday morning show The Right Side, and was a regular contributor to The Arts Show, The Marian Finucane Show and A Living Word. In the UK he has worked for the BBC, Channel 4 and Channel 5, both as a scriptwriter and presenter.

Also on RTÉ, Moncrieff has presented The Big 40, a celebration of forty years of Irish television, Ireland Undercover, HQ, The Holiday Quiz, and he is the voice of The Restaurant. In 2014 he presented the TV3 quiz show "Crossfire".

Moncrieff currently presents The Moncrieff Show each weekday afternoon, between 2.00pm and 4:00pm on the Irish independent radio station Newstalk. Since going on air in 2004, the show has won eleven PPI Radio Awards. In 2016, Moncrieff was named speech broadcaster of the year.

Writing
His first novel, Dublin, was published in May 2001 by Doubleday publishers and reached the bestseller lists in Ireland. A non-fiction book, Stark Raving Rulers: twenty minor despots of the twenty-first century, was published in October 2004, followed by God, A Users' Guide in 2006. A second novel, The History of Things, was published in September 2007 and praised by the Irish Independent, who said it was "arguably the best Irish novel of the year". A third novel, The Angel of the Streetlamps was published in December 2012. His sixth book, "The Irish Paradox" was published in 2015.

Awards
Moncrieff has been voted Radio's Sexiest Voice.

The Moncrieff Show on Newstalk has won twelve PPI/IMRO radio awards in a number of categories and two gongs at the New York radio Awards.

References

External links
 Moncrieff at Newstalk

20th-century Irish people
21st-century Irish people
Living people
Alumni of University College Dublin
Irish journalists
Irish non-fiction writers
Irish novelists
Irish people of Scottish descent
Newstalk presenters
People from County Galway
British emigrants to Ireland
RTÉ Radio presenters
RTÉ television presenters
Irish male novelists
People educated at Garbally College
Year of birth missing (living people)
Male non-fiction writers